The 2018 Clarkson Cup was held at the Ricoh Coliseum in Toronto on 25 March 2018 with the Markham Thunder defeating the Kunlun Red Star by a score of 2–1. Laura Stacey scored the game-winning goal with 2 minutes 11 seconds remaining in the overtime period. Markahm's earlier goal had been scored by Nicole Brown. Markham's goaltender Erica Howe was named the Most Valuable Player.

Game summary

Clarkson Cup playoffs
Laura Stacey would score against Noora Raty of the Kunlun Red Star with 2:11 left in the 4-on-4 overtime, as Markham prevailed by a 2–1 score for its first Clarkson Cup win.

Markham Thunder – 2018 Clarkson Cup champions

Defenders
3 Jocelyne Larocque
8 Laura Fortino
10 Alexis Woloschuk
11 Megan Delay
18 Jessica Hartwick
19 Dania Simmonds
23 Lindsay Grigg
24 Kristen Barbara
94 Megan Bozek

Forwards
2 Becca King
7 Laura Stacey
9 Kristen Richards 
15 Laura McIntosh
16 Fielding Montgomery
17 Nicole Brown
21 Devon Skeats
22 Nicole Kosta
25 Taylor Woods
26 Jamie Lee Rattray
28 Melissa Wronzberg
91 Jenna McParland
96 Karolina Urban

Goaltenders
 27 Erica Howe  
 31 Jamie Miller
 37 Liz Knox 

Coaching and Administrative Staff''
 Jim Jackson, head coach
 Kevin Stone, assistant coach
 Candice Moxley, assistant coach
Jess Pemberton, trainer
Chelsea Purcell, general manager

Awards and honors
Playoff MVP: Erica Howe
First Star of the Game: Laura Stacey
Second Star of the Game: Nicole Brown
Third Star of the Game: Kelli Stack

References

2018
2017–18 in women's ice hockey
Ice hockey competitions in Toronto
2018 in Toronto
2018 in Canadian sports